Enno Lend (born 18 November 1957 in Tallinn) is an Estonian economist and rector of Tallinn University of Technology.

Since 2010 he is the rector of Tallinn University of Applied Sciences.

In 2005 he was awarded with Order of the White Star, IV class.

References

Living people
1957 births
21st-century Estonian economists
Rectors of universities in Estonia
Recipients of the Order of the White Star, 4th Class
Tallinn University of Technology alumni
People from Tallinn
20th-century Estonian economists